Eric Nunn was an Australian professional soccer player who played as a half-back and was an international player for the Australia national soccer team.

Club career
Nunn played with the Dinmore Bush Rats throughout the 1920s. He won the 1928 Tristram Shield against Thistle where Dinmore Bush Rats won 2–1 in the Final. He joined Booval Stars in 1930, where he gave up playing soccer in 1932 until he returned two years later with Booval Stars.

International career
Nunn played his first and only international match for Australia against Canada where Australia won 3–2 on 7 June 1924.

Nunn is designated Socceroo cap number 31.

Career statistics

International

References

Australian soccer players
Association football midfielders
Australia international soccer players